Hermani is a village in Järva Parish, Järva County in central Estonia.

It was established on 7 September 2015 established by detaching the land from Käsukonna village.

References

Villages in Järva County
Kreis Fellin